The stone circles of the Iron Age (c. 500 BC – c. 400 AD) were a characteristic burial custom of southern Scandinavia and Southwestern Finland, especially on Gotland and in Götaland. 

Finland  court stones are found  in Eura, Ulvila and Kokemäki.
They date typically during the Pre-Roman Iron Age and the Roman Iron Age. 
In Sweden, they are called Domarringar (judge circles), Domkretsar (judge circles) or Domarsäten (judge seats). In Finland they are called Käräjäkivet (court stones). In some places in Nordic countries they were used until 17th century

They should not be confused with the Stone circles of the Bronze Age and Britain.

History 

A tradition of making stone circles existed on the European continent in Wielbark culture near the mouth of the Vistula River in the first century. The practice suggests Norse influence but may have been established in the area before the arrival of the Goths.

The stone circles were sometimes used as burial grounds.

Shapes 
The circles are usually round, or elongated ellipses. The stones may be very large and they are usually between 9 and 12. Sometimes there are as few as 6–8. One stone circle, the circle of Nässja (near Vadstena), comprises as many as 24 stones. Excavations have shown burnt coal in the centre of the circles and they are nowadays considered to be incineration graves.

Things
There is a widespread tradition that the circles were used for things, or general assemblies. Similar circles were used for popular assemblies in Denmark until the 16th century, and in Vad parish in Västergötland, the village assemblies were held in a stone circle until the 19th century.

Snorri Sturluson
Even if knowledge that the stone circles were graves was later lost, it was still fresh in the 13th century as testify these lines by Snorri Sturluson in the introduction of the Heimskringla:

Examples
 Gettlinge burial field, Öland, Sweden
 Hulterstad burial field, Öland, Sweden
 Jelling stones, Vejle, Denmark
 Käräjämäki, Eura, Finland
 Käräjämäki, Kokemäki, Finland
 Liikistö, Ulvila, Finland
 Stoplesteinan, Norway
 Odry, Pomerania, Poland
 Węsiory burial field, Kashubia, Poland

See also
Gårdlösa

References

Sources
Nationalencyklopedin
 A Polish Archaeology Article by Tadeusz Makiewicz
 ADuong's a history of Poland

Goths
Germanic archaeological sites
Scandinavian history
Archaeology of Sweden
Burial monuments and structures
Stone circles in Europe
Prehistoric Poland
Iron Age Europe
Iron Age sites in Europe